District Institute of Education and Training, Hardoi abbreviated as "DIET Hardoi" is a Government Training College for teachers. It offers several training programmes to teaching professionals. DIET Hardoi offers B.T.C. as its main full-time academic program which is also known as Diploma in Elementary Education outside of Uttar Pradesh.

Course offered
It offers 2 year B.T.C. course which is also known as Diploma in Elementary Education outside of Uttar Pradesh. The institute was recognized for 200 B.T.C. seats by National Council for Teacher Education. Every year 200 students are allowed to take admission in the B.T.C. course on the basis of a district level merit list.

References

External links
 http://hardoi.nic.in/BtcDiet.html

Universities and colleges in Uttar Pradesh
Colleges of education in India
Hardoi